Tamdybulaq, sometimes also written as Tamdybulak, is an urban-type settlement and seat of Tamdy District in Navoiy Region in Uzbekistan. Its population is 5,000 (2022 est.).

Geography

Tamdybulak lies in the Kyzyl Kum desert, a flat, arid plain with scattered sand dunes.

Transportation

Tamdybulak is served by the Tamdy Bulak Airport.

Roads from the town lead southwest to Zarafshan, southeast to Ayakkuduk, and north to Sukuti and Keriz.

Climate

Tamdybulak has a desert climate (Köppen climate classification BWk), with cold winters and very hot summers. Rain is light and sporadic, and usually occurs from November to May.

References

Populated places in Navoiy Region
Urban-type settlements in Uzbekistan